Jakob Dirnberger (born May 7, 1980 in Hallein) is a professional squash player who represents Austria. He reached a career-high world ranking of World No. 123 in January 2008.

References

External links 
 
 
 

Austrian squash players
Living people
1980 births
People from Hallein
Sportspeople from Salzburg (state)